Grabowskia sodiroi is a species of plant in the family Solanaceae. It is endemic to Ecuador.

References

sodiroi
Endemic flora of Ecuador
Data deficient plants
Taxonomy articles created by Polbot
Taxa named by Friedrich August Georg Bitter